Bach: The Great Passion is a 2017 biographical radio play by the English writer James Runcie, dealing with the inception and premiere of the St Matthew Passion. It premiered on BBC Radio 4 on 15 April 2017, with Simon Russell Beale in the title role, directed by Eoin O'Callaghan and produced by Marilyn Imrie.

Premiere cast
Johann Sebastian Bach - Simon Russell Beale
Anna Magdalena Bach - Melody Grove 
Christian Henrici - Al Weaver 
Stefan Meissner - Adam Greaves Neal 
Paul Christian Stolle, one of Bach's pupils - Stephen Boxer 
Salomon Deyling - David Horovitch 
Johann Gottlieb Gorner - Tom Goodman-Hill
Herman - Ewan Rutherford 
Bach's Child - Damon Denton-Snape

References

2017 plays
Plays based on real people
Plays set in the 18th century
Plays set in Germany
Biographical plays about musicians
Cultural depictions of Johann Sebastian Bach